Abdel Aziz El-Hammami (died before 2009) was an Egyptian footballer. He competed in the men's tournament at the 1948 Summer Olympics.

References

External links
 
 

Year of birth missing
Year of death missing
Egyptian footballers
Egypt international footballers
Olympic footballers of Egypt
Footballers at the 1948 Summer Olympics
Place of birth missing
Association football defenders
Mediterranean Games silver medalists for Egypt
Mediterranean Games medalists in football
Footballers at the 1951 Mediterranean Games
Al Ahly SC players